The Sound is an Australian music program broadcast on the ABC, which first screened on Sunday 19 July 2020. The program is hosted by Jane Gazzo and Zan Rowe with a special guest co-host each week. It is created and filmed by Mushroom Vision and screens on Sundays at 5.30pm with a replay on Saturdays at 12.30pm. The pre-recorded live performances are also available to watch on ABC iview. The Sound features pre-recorded live performances, music videos of new releases and interviews with artists, highlighting Australia's "best and upcoming talent". The program features a historical segment called "The Vault", which shows an iconic Australian performance, as well as "A Tribute" which pays tribute to "great Australian tracks" where various artists perform collaboratively.

A second series commenced on 1 November 2020.

A third series was announced in October 2021 and premiered on 7 November 2021, at a shorter length of 30 minutes per episode.

Series overview

Episodes
 Performances listed in order they were presented.

Season One

Season Two

Season Three
Season three will feature a rotating roster of guest hosts, replacing previous hosts Jane Gazzo, Zan Rowe and Bridget Hustwaite. The "Tribute" section for season three will be pay respect to living artists.

References

External links
 

2020 Australian television series debuts
2020s Australian television series
Australian Broadcasting Corporation original programming
Australian music television series
English-language television shows